"Axis" is a song by English synth-pop duo Pet Shop Boys from their twelfth studio album, Electric (2013). It was released on 1 May 2013 as the album's lead single.

Background
"Axis" was written during the writing sessions for the duo's previous album, Elysium (2012). The song was produced by Stuart Price.

Release
"Axis" was released digitally on 1 May 2013 and as a twelve-inch single on 15 July 2013. The latter format includes a remix by Boys Noize, which was also released as a digital download.

Music video
The music video for "Axis" was released on 30 April 2013.

Live performances
The song was performed as the opening track on the Electric Tour in a slightly shorter and more up-tempo version.

Track listings

Charts

References

2013 singles
2013 songs
Hi-NRG songs
Pet Shop Boys songs
Song recordings produced by Stuart Price
Songs written by Chris Lowe
Songs written by Neil Tennant